"Honestly" is the title of a power ballad by Canadian glam metal band Harem Scarem. The song appears on their 1991 self-titled debut album. The song charted at #68 on the Canadian singles chart and also had a music video shot for it.  The music video starred American actor Judge Reinhold as the male love interest. The song garnered  popularity in Asian countries mainly the Philippines and Indonesia, and to this day the song is still played constantly in radio stations and bars.

Band
Harry Hess - vocals
Pete Lesperance – guitar
Mike Gionet - bass guitar
Darren Smith - drums
Ray Coburn - keyboards

References

External links
Harem Scarem | Official website

1991 songs
1992 singles
Harem Scarem songs
Hard rock ballads
Warner Music Group singles
1990s ballads